Sahasralinga Tank or Sahasralinga Talav is a medieval artificial water tank in Patan, Gujarat, India. It was commissioned during Chaulukya (Solanki) rule, but now it is empty and in a ruined state. It is a Monument of National Importance protected by Archaeological Survey of India (N-GJ-161).

History
Sahasralinga Tank is among the many artificial tanks built in different parts of Gujarat under the patronages of Jayasimha Siddharaja (1092-1142 AD). There was earlier a smaller tank named Durlabh Sarovar at this place, built by Durlabharaja. Jayasimha Siddharaja in early part of 12th century, expanded and decorated this lake with temples, Kunds, ghats and various other buildings, including Palace and educational institutions and Dharma-shalas.

Design and Architecture 
The Sahasralinga Tank was one of the largest and grandest water tanks in size.

The lake was in rectangular form. The great embankment surrounding it is of solid brick work and was faced with stone masonry forming flights of steps to the water's edge. Water was directed from Saraswati river by a canal to this lake. Inside the canal, there was a Kupa (reservoir), called Rudra-Kupa, which was built to smooth the flow of the gushing water from the river. It was named Rudra-Kupa rightly, as it checked the flow of Saraswati river just as god Rudra (Shiva) checked the flow of river Ganga. From Rudra-Kupa, the water was diverted to Sahasralinga tank by three channels, thus it was called Triveni. On the banks of lake, numerous little temples containing over 1000 shiva-lingam were placed, which Jayasimha Siddharaja brought from Amarkantak. On all sides, temples were built, most of which are either destroyed or converted to mosques. There was image of god Vishnu on the brink of lake water.

These temples were dismantled during the late medieval period when a large octagonal rauza was raised on a part of its ruins. Near the middle of the eastern embankment are the remains of the old Shiva temple, comprising the basements of the pavilions together with a colonnade of forty eight pillars. Towards the western end, there is a basin in which water from the Saraswati river was collected and then allowed to pass into the inlet channel of the Sahasralinga Tank. This cistern is about forty meters in diameter.

Many tirths were located on the banks of the lake:
Dasavmedh Tirth. 
Jaangal Tirth
Devi Tirth
Vindhyavasini Tirth
Dashavtar Tirth
Prabhas Tirh
Temple of Lakulish
Reva Tirth
Vinayak Tirth
Swami Tirth
Pishach-Mochan Tirth
Surya Tirth
Kolla Tirth
Kapalisha Tirth
Gandharva Tirth
Varah Tirth
Durga Tirth
Matr Tirth

Sahasralinga lake was used for irrigation and other purposes by residents of Patan.

Destruction of the lake
In early part of 14th century, Patan was attacked by Alf Khan, general of the Khalji dynasty, the temples along the banks suffered damage but the lake survived. Till the reign of Akbar, the lake survived in good condition as Bairam Khan, Akbar's tutor, while passing through Patan on his way to Mecca, was said to have been murdered after he returned from boating in this tank in 1561.

The temples were destroyed and paved embarkments of the lake being removed over time. It is suspected that due to heavy flood in river Saraswati, the city was submerged and the lake was destroyed. One of the banks of the lake towards the city is called Phati Padno Pol, which indicates the lake might have burst out from this side.

Legend
Jasma Odan, a wife of Rooda who belonged to the Od community of tank diggers, cursed Chaulukya ruler Jayasimha Siddharaja who, captivated by her beauty, proposed marriage to her. Due to the curse, the tank would not fill with water. To repeal the curse, a human sacrifice was needed. Mayo or Mahya(Jay Vir Maghmaya), from the lower caste Vankar community, sacrificed himself resulting in water filling the tank. Jaysimha, out of gratitude, allowed his caste to stay with higher castes in town.

This legend of Jasma Odan is untrue. The fragmentary inscription on Bijal Mahadeo Kuan in Patan, which was originally inscribed on Kirtistambha that once stood on the banks of this lake in Patan, mentions that the water was directed to this lake to fill the lake for irrigation and other purposes since the lake’s original water source wasn’t enough to fill the lake. Similar instances have been noted to fill the lakes by river water, Karna Sagar near Modhera, Ana Sagar in Ajmer through waters of Chandra Nahar.

Gallery

See also
 Jasma Odan
 Patan, Gujarat

Spelling confusion
Sahasra is the correct suffix that means "a thousand", not SahasTra. However, it is invariably misspelled as the latter. Notice how the same suffix is spelled when it occurs in family names (example: Sahasrabuddhe) without a T. The confusion arises because the Hindi letter "Sa" (स) merges with "ra" (र) and looks like "tra".

References 

Reservoirs in India
Tourist attractions in Patan district
Buildings and structures in Gujarat
Indian architectural history
Cultural history of Gujarat
Monuments of National Importance in Gujarat